Denis Igoryevich Yuskov (born 11 October 1989) is a Russian speed skater. He is a three-time gold medalist in men's 1500 meters (2013, 2015, 2016) at the World Single Distance Championships  and the World Cup-2016 holder at the distance 1500 m.

Personal life
Yuskov is married and has one son, Adrian (born on 27 March 2010). His mother was Master of Sports of the USSR in volleyball. His wife Alla, her brother Anton and Denis's sister Yana were all skaters in the past. His nephew is professional ice hockey player Ilya Antonovsky.

Career
Yuskov was born in Moscow, but spent his early childhood in Moldova. He later relocated with his mother back to Moscow before starting school. Dennis first met his sister from skating practice at the school, and then he started to do it, thinking it was a football team. Soon Yuskov became a member of the selected team of Moscow, setting national records in different age categories and at different distances and in the allround. Yuskov has been invited into the national junior national team.

2011–12 season — after his doping suspension was lifted, Denis Yuskov returned in the international field by competing at the 2012 European Championship, where he finished in 8th place. Later that year Yuskov competed at the World Single Distance Championships finishing in 6th place in the 1500 meters and 7th place in the 5000 meters. He also won a bronze in the team pursuit along with his compatriots Ivan Skobrev and Yevgeny Lalenkov.

2012–13 season — he won a World Cup event in Inzell, and on 21 March 2013, he became world champion in men's 1500 meters, 2013 World Single Distance Speed Skating Championships held at the Adler Arena in Sochi, updating the track record of 1:46.32. At the 5000 meter and team pursuit, he missed out the podium.

The Olympic season 2013–14 began Yuskov with a 3:34.37 at the 3000 meter run in a quartet starts during a training race before the first World Cup race of the season. This is the fastest time ever ridden, but is not recognized as an official world record. Yuskov competed at the 2014 Sochi Olympics, however only 6th place in 5000 m, 17th in men's 1000 m and finished on the 4th place in the 1500 meters. In March 2014, at the 2014 World Allround Speed Skating Championships in Heerenveen, Yuskov won the 1500 meters and took a new personal record in the 10,000 meters. He came 3rd in the allround standings earning him the bronze medal. In early April, at the National championships in Chelyabinsk, he won the gold medal in the 500 m, 1500 m, 5000 m and 10,000 m. Thus, becoming the new undisputed champion in allround of Russia.

In the 2014–15 season, Yuskov competed at the 2015 European Championships winning the allround bronze. On 13 February 2015, at the 2015 World Single Distance Speed Skating Championships, he repeated as gold medalist in 1500 meters.

In the 2015–16 season. Yuskov opened his season winning the 1500 m gold at the 2015–16 ISU Speed Skating World Cup in Calgary, setting a new personal record clocking a time of 1:41.88. He then competed at the Inzell World Cup in Germany winning gold in men's 1500 m and a silver in 1000 m behind Dutch speed skater Kjeld Nuis. At the 2015–16 ISU World Cup in Heerenveen, Yuskov won 2 silver medals in 1000 m behind teammate Pavel Kulizhnikov and in 1500 m behind American Joey Mantia. In December 2015, he repeated as the allround champion at the 2016 Russian Nationals. On 9–10 January, Yuskov competed at the 2016 European Speed Skating Championships in Minsk where he placed first in men's 500 m and 1500 m however he was unable to finish the allaround events, as he later withdrew in men's 10000 m because of a minor groin injury. He returned to competition in 29–31 January at the ISU World Cup in Stavanger where he won gold in 1500 and bronze in 1000 m. On 11–14 February, At the 2016 World Single Distance Speed Skating Championships in Kolomna, Yuskov won the gold in men's 1500 m and silver in men's 1000 m behind teammate Pavel Kulizhnikov.
Yuskov then competed at the 2016 World Allround Speed Skating Championships however he withdrew after the 500 m distance event because of a minor groin injury. On 11–13 March, after the World Cup Final in Heerenveen, Yuskov won the World Cup of the 2015–16 season in the 1500 m distance.

In the 2016–17 season. Yuskov won 1500 meters at the 2017 European Championships  and took the 7th place on the all-round. In 2017 World Allround Speed Skating Championships Denis won the 1500 meters, but stopped on tree distances. On 9 December 2017, at the 2017 World Single Distance Speed Skating Championships, he was the silver medalist in 1500 meters, while Kjeld Nuis won gold and Sven Kramer won bronze. Yuskov won the silver  on ISU World Cup after the gold medalist Kjeld Nuis.

In the 2017–18 season. Denis Yuskov competed four time before the winter Olympic games at the ISU World Cup and four time won the gold in distance 1500 meters and in Salt Lake City broke World record. In the distance 1000 m also won the gold medal. In 5–7 January 2018 Yuskov competed at the 2018 European Speed Skating Championships and won two gold medals in 1500 m and team sprint, and the silver medal in 1000 m.

Personal records

He is currently in 8th position in the adelskalender with 145.896 points.

Source: SpeedskatingResults.com* National record

World Cup podiums

Overall rankings

References

External links

Denis Yuskov ISU
Denis bio page 	
Denis Yuskov Sports Bio

1989 births
Russian male speed skaters
Speed skaters at the 2014 Winter Olympics
Olympic speed skaters of Russia
Speed skaters from Moscow
Living people
Russian sportspeople in doping cases
Doping cases in speed skating
World Allround Speed Skating Championships medalists
World Single Distances Speed Skating Championships medalists